The Shadow is a video game based on the 1994 Universal film of the same name. It was planned for release in 1994 on the Super NES, alongside other systems, but was canceled.

Gameplay

The gameplay is similar to other Beat 'em up games such as Final Fight or Double Dragon, where the player controls The Shadow through several levels (including streets, museums, carnivals and laboratories) fighting against several enemies, such as hoodlums, Mongol Warriors, scientists, security guards and sailors. The player has two bars; one is the life bar and a bar that allows the player to perform special attacks (invisibility, speed running, a dome shield that knocks out everyone who hits it). The regular beat 'em up levels also include a section for gun play, where the player is able to shoot enemies. It also contains a driving stage where The Shadow battles Mongols on motorbikes (Maritech Labs).

Plot
The game roughly follows the plot of the movie, where The Shadow battles crime in New York city, until he is confronted by the evil mastermind Shiwan Khan. Khan intends to use an atomic bomb to blow up the city, culminating in a showdown at the hidden Hotel Monolith.

Development 
A video game version of The Shadow for the SNES was developed to tie in with the film, but after the low box office gross, was never released despite being completed. 

A version of the game was also being developed and planned to be published by Ocean Software for the Atari Jaguar CD as one of the first games announced for the then-upcoming add-on, however, development on the port was scrapped in favor of creating a conversion of Lobo, an unreleased fighting game based on the DC Comics character of the same name that was also in development by Ocean. A Sega Genesis port was also planned but never released as well.

Reception 

Next Generation reviewed the SNES version of the game, rating it two stars out of five, and stated that "The Shadow boils down to a 'take-it-or-leave-it' no-brainer of a title".

References

External links 
 The Shadow at GameFAQs
 The Shadow at Giant Bomb

1994 video games
Cancelled Atari Jaguar games
Cancelled Sega Genesis games
Cancelled Super Nintendo Entertainment System games
Ocean Software games
Superhero video games
The Shadow
Video games based on films
Video games set in New York City
Video games set in the 1930s